Eoophyla nyasalis is a moth in the family Crambidae. It was described by George Hampson in 1917. It is found in Cameroon, the Democratic Republic of the Congo, Ethiopia, Kenya, Malawi, Nigeria, Sierra Leone, Tanzania and Zambia.

The wingspan is 20–24 mm. The base of the forewings is pale orange, with a subbasal scattering of fuscous scales. The median area is suffused with fuscous and there is an orange streak between the middle of the costa and the tornus. The base of the hindwings is whitish with an orange antemedian fascia, suffused with fuscous scales. Adults are on wing from May to June and from August to March.

Subspecies
Eoophyla nyasalis nyasalis
Eoophyla nyasalis kenyalis Agassiz, 2012 (Kenya)

References

Eoophyla
Moths described in 1917